Vignale railway station is the railway station serving the comune of Novara, in the Piedmont region, northwestern Italy. It is the junction of the Novara–Arona, Novara–Domodossola and Novara–Varallo

The station is currently managed by Rete Ferroviaria Italiana (RFI). Train services are operated by Trenitalia.  Each of these companies is a subsidiary of Ferrovie dello Stato (FS), Italy's state-owned rail company.

History
The station was opened on 14 June 1855, upon the inauguration the third part of the Alessandria–Novara–Arona railway, from Novara to Arona.

Features
Two tracks of which are equipped with platforms.

Train services
The station is served by the following services:

Regional services (Treno regionale) Novara - Arona

See also

 History of rail transport in Italy
 List of railway stations in Piedmont
 Rail transport in Italy
 Railway stations in Italy

References

External links

Railway stations in Piedmont
Railway stations opened in 1855
1855 establishments in Italy
Railway stations in Italy opened in the 19th century